Carlisle M. Adams is a Canadian cryptographer and computer security researcher. Formerly senior cryptographer at Entrust, he is currently a professor at the University of Ottawa. His notable work includes the design (with Stafford Tavares) of the block ciphers CAST-128 and CAST-256, whose S-boxes are based on the non-linear properties of bent functions. He also helped organize the first Selected Areas in Cryptography (SAC) workshop in 1994. He is also the security advisor of the Ottawa-based electronic signature company Signority.

References

External links 
 Carlisle Adams's page at uOttawa

Living people
Modern cryptographers
Public-key cryptographers
Canadian computer scientists
Computer security academics
Academic staff of the University of Ottawa
Queen's University at Kingston alumni
Year of birth missing (living people)